María Luisa Marchori (1801 Madrid - circa 1900) was a Spanish painter of the first half of the 19th century. She was one of the first honorary academics of the Real Academia de Bellas Artes de San Fernando.

Life 
Marchori was born in Madrid at the beginning of the 19th century. Although few data exist about her early years, at that time it was very common for young women, particularly noble ones, to learn to paint as part of his training.  Apprenticeship in male painters' workshops was the career path for women who wanted to be able to earn a living as painters . In the 19th century, art academies were inaccessible to women, under rationales such as that anatomy and nude classes were inappropriate for women. The Royal Academy of Fine Arts of San Fernando, located in Madrid, prohibited access to women except for exceptions and by requesting a special permit.

Although women could not access the San Fernando Royal Academy of Fine Arts as artists, it was possible to become official members in other ways, mainly through the titles of Honorary Academician and Merit Academician.  In fact, the first Merit Academician of the institution was a woman, Bárbara María Hueva .  Although Hueva appears in the minutes as an Academician of Merit, she later received the designation of Supernumerary. Marchori was one of five other women to receive this distinction, possibly due to social differences.  In order to apply for this designation as an academic, it was necessary to present exceptional works: Marchori decided to copy a work by Luis de Morales depicting Christ carrying the cross. On 21 September 1828, she presented the oil painting to the San Fernando Royal Academy of Fine Arts, and on 20 November, she was awarded the academic title.

References 

Spanish painters

1801 births
1900s deaths
Year of death uncertain

es:Maria Luisa Marchori